Patrick Mevoungou (born 15 February 1986) is a Cameroonian football midfielder. He made two appearances for the Cameroon national team.

Career
Born in Yaoundé, Mevoungou began his career with Espoir Ebowola. Between 2005 and 2006 he played for Cameroonian top league club Union Douala.

In 2006, he emigrated to Macedonia where he played one season with FK Renova before moving to China, to play the 2008 season with Dalian Haichang. After this first experience abroad, he returned to Cameroon and signed with Canon Yaoundé where he played two seasons. It was then, that he decided to emigrate again, this to play on loan with Austrian Bundesliga club SK Sturm Graz.

Mevongou played for the Cameroon national team and he was part of the wider list of players pre-selected to participate in the 2010 FIFA World Cup.

References

External links
 
 

1986 births
Living people
Footballers from Yaoundé
Cameroonian footballers
Cameroon international footballers
Association football midfielders
Elite One players
Union Douala players
Canon Yaoundé players
Macedonian First Football League players
FK Renova players
Chinese Super League players
Dalian Shide F.C. players
Austrian Football Bundesliga players
SK Sturm Graz players
FC Admira Wacker Mödling players
Nemzeti Bajnokság I players
Győri ETO FC players
Mezőkövesdi SE footballers
Diósgyőri VTK players
Puskás Akadémia FC players
Kisvárda FC players
Al-Tai FC players
Saudi First Division League players
Cameroonian expatriate footballers
Cameroonian expatriate sportspeople in North Macedonia
Expatriate footballers in North Macedonia
Cameroonian expatriate sportspeople in China
Expatriate footballers in China
Cameroonian expatriate sportspeople in Austria
Expatriate footballers in Austria
Cameroonian expatriate sportspeople in Hungary
Expatriate footballers in Hungary
Cameroonian expatriate sportspeople in Saudi Arabia
Expatriate footballers in Saudi Arabia